Nightside is a 1980 television pilot starring Doug McClure.

Plot
Television pilot about the adventures of a streetwise cop working the night shift in Los Angeles with a naive partner.

References

External links

1980 television films
1980 films
American television films
Television films as pilots
Television pilots not picked up as a series
1980s English-language films